The 2022 Myanmar Women's League   was the 4rd season of the Myanmar Women's League, the top Myanmar professional league for women's association football clubs, since its establishment in 2016. A total of 7 teams competed in the league, with the season beginning on 3 October 2022.

ISPE were the defending champions, having won the Myanmar Women's League title the previous season.

League table

Below is the league table for 22 season.

Matches
Fixtures and Results of the 2018–19 Women League season.

Week 1

Week 2

Season statistics

Top scorers
As of 9 Oct 2022.

See also
 2022 Myanmar National League
 2022 MNL-2

References

Women's football leagues in Myanmar